Ekaterina Vilmont  (Екатерина Николаевна Вильмонт; 24 April 1946 – 16 May 2021) was a Russian writer.

She was included multiple times in the annual lists of the most published authors of fiction in Russia compiled by the Russian Book Chamber. Several million copies of books by Vilmont have been sold.

References

21st-century Russian writers
Russian women writers
1946 births
2021 deaths
Writers from Moscow
Place of death missing